Janice Tindle (born July 3, 1950) is a Canadian former professional tennis player.

Tennis career
Tindle, a Vancouver-based player, won back to back national singles championships in 1972 and 1973. She played collegiate tennis for Arizona State University and represented Canada in six Federation Cup ties. In 1973 she was a main draw qualifier at the Wimbledon Championships, where she lost her first round match to Wendy Turnbull in three sets.

Personal life
Tindle's siblings Jill, Kim and Mark were all tennis players. Olympic swimmer Leslie Cliff married her brother Mark.

See also
List of Canada Fed Cup team representatives

References

External links
 
 
 

1950 births
Living people
Arizona State Sun Devils women's tennis players
Canadian female tennis players
Racket sportspeople from British Columbia
Sportspeople from Vancouver